François Florent, stage name of François Eichholtzer (30 April 1937 – 27 September 2021) was a French theater actor. He was the founder of the eponymous drama school Cours Florent, the alumni of which include Isabelle Adjani and Audrey Tatou.

He was married to actress Martine Grimaud.

References

1937 births
2021 deaths
French male stage actors
Drama teachers
Actors from Mulhouse
Commanders of the Ordre national du Mérite
Chevaliers of the Légion d'honneur